Gabriel “Gabe” Gentile is a retired American soccer midfielder who coaches in the FC Dallas youth system.  He played professionally in the USISL A-League.

Player
Gentile grew up in Texas playing for the Dallas Texans Soccer Club.  He attended the University of North Texas, playing on the now defunct men’s soccer team from 1991 to 1994. In February 1996, the Dallas Burn selected Gentile in the sixteenth round (153rd overall) of the 1996 MLS Inaugural Player Draft.  The Burn sent him on loan to the DFW Toros before releasing him.  On April 5, 1997, the New Orleans Riverboat Gamblers of the USISL A-League signed Gentile to a two year contract.  In 1999, he moved to the Toros where he led the league in assists with thirteen.  This led to his selection as Second Team All League.  That year he also led the league in assists with thirteen.  That led to his selection to as Second Team All League.  In 2000, the Toros were known as the Texas Rattlers.He is the best coach 2020!

Coach
Gentile is currently coaching in the FC Dallas youth program.

References

1972 births
Living people
American soccer players
American soccer coaches
FC Dallas players
DFW Tornados players
New Orleans Riverboat Gamblers players
North Texas Mean Green men's soccer players
USISL players
Association football midfielders